Toyah is a town in Reeves County, Texas, United States. The population was 90 at the 2010 census.

History

On October 25, 1906 a black man in Toyah named J. I. "Slab" Pitts was dragged to death and then hanged for living with his white wife, Eva Ruff.

In September, 1928 Amelia Earhart made an unscheduled five-day stop to adjust her carburetor. She relates in her journal that she landed in a small town near Pecos, Texas, but according to a regional book, The Toyah Taproots, several local, unnamed youngsters were seen in pictures around her airplane were later identified as being from Toyah.

Much of the town was destroyed by a tornado in 2004. Several abandoned homes, a deserted volunteer fire department and forgotten cars sit on the empty streets. The enormous Toyah High School also remains.

Geography

Demographics

At the 2000 census there were 100 people, 47 households, and 28 families living in the town. The population density was 61.6 people per square mile (23.8/km). There were 72 housing units at an average density of 44.3 per square mile (17.2/km).  The racial makeup of the town was 84.00% White, 4.00% African American, 2.00% Native American, 4.00% from other races, and 6.00% from two or more races. Hispanic or Latino people of any race were 51.00%.

Of the 47 households 14.9% had children under the age of 18 living with them, 51.1% were married couples living together, 4.3% had a female householder with no husband present, and 38.3% were non-families. 36.2% of households were one person and 19.1% were one person aged 65 or older. The average household size was 2.13 and the average family size was 2.79.

The age distribution was 13.0% under the age of 18, 8.0% from 18 to 24, 24.0% from 25 to 44, 27.0% from 45 to 64, and 28.0% 65 or older. The median age was 48 years. For every 100 females, there were 138.1 males. For every 100 females age 18 and over, there were 128.9 males.

The median household income was $16,500 and the median family income  was $15,313. Males had a median income of $19,375 versus $11,250 for females. The per capita income for the town was $8,611. There were 47.8% of families and 52.9% of the population living below the poverty line, including 100.0% of under 18 and 22.2% of those over 64.

Education
The Town of Toyah is served by the Pecos-Barstow-Toyah Independent School District.

References

Towns in Reeves County, Texas
Towns in Texas
Ghost towns in West Texas
Lynching deaths in Texas